Events from the year 1755 in Canada.

Incumbents
French Monarch: Louis XV
British and Irish Monarch: George II

Governors
Governor General of New France: Michel-Ange Duquesne de Menneville
Colonial Governor of Louisiana: Louis Billouart
Governor of Nova Scotia: Peregrine Hopson
Commodore-Governor of Newfoundland: Hugh Bonfoy

Events
 1755-75 - William Johnson, British superintendent of Indian affairs in the northern colonies, persuades the Iroquois League to break its neutrality and side with England against France.
 Monday June 16 - Fort Beausejour, garrisoned by 400 Frenchmen, is surrendered to Col. Winslow, of Massachusetts, commanding 2,300, of whom 300 are regulars.
 July: Seven British Colonial Governors form a Treaty with the Iroquois, and project a federal union for carrying on war, under a president to be named by the King.
 Tuesday July 15 - Announcement, in England, of the capture of French troops on their way to Canada.
 Monday September 8 - Baron Dieskay, with 1,500 French and Indian troops, overcomes Col. Williams, with 1,400 English and Indians, near Fort George. Immediately afterwards, the French attack Col. Johnson's force, barricaded at Fort George, but are repelled, with heavy loss. The two commanders are wounded, and the two opposing Indian chiefs are killed. Baron Dieskay is captured by the English, who dress his wounds and earn his lifelong gratitude by their kindness.
 For his success at Fort George, Col. Johnson is made a baronet, with a grant of 5,000 pounds.
 The Great Expulsion begins. English Expulsion of the French Acadians—who lived and intermarried with Nova Scotia and Cape Breton Mi'kmaqs (many of whom were also taken). Forcibly loaded into ships and deposited randomly along the southern (now American) coasts, many (probably 1/3 to 1/2) died. Some are ancestors of the Cajuns of Louisiana, and a few made their ways back home. Acadians were idealists, hostile to King and Church authority, who lived in peace with the Mi'kmaqs. Neither the French rulers nor the English wanted them.

Deaths

 September 13 - Pierre Gaultier de La Vérendrye, explorer (born 1714)

Historical documents
Losing Nova Scotia, with its population and harbours, to French would allow them "to reduce all the English Colonies"

"The limits of Acadia and Canada[...]have served England as a pretence for commencing hostilities," while France has sought peace

Map: lands and waters from Rainy Lake (?) to Grand Banks

In last pre-war negotiations, British insist lower Great Lakes and St. Lawrence River are Anglo-French boundaries, and Six Nations lands are British

Eliminating £1 million fishery (1755) off Cape Breton Island as one source of France's naval power will diminish it as threat to Britain and Europe

Map: French and British colonies and (in pink) territory occupied by British allies "& disputés parles François"

Superintendent of Indian Affairs William Johnson and Kanien’kéhà:ka agree to mutual support despite doubts about each other

With settlement of their land claims, William Johnson expects Six Nations support as war with France begins in North America

Lt. Gov. James De Lancey outlines how troops assembled in New York could attack French in region from Montreal to Fort Duquesne

Priest relates Mi'kmaw practices in feasting, praise, war, and courtship and marriage (Note: "savages" used and cruelty described)

Robert Monckton orders all on Chignecto and Saint John River "not yet submitted" to do so with their arms or "be treated as Rebels"

Charles Lawrence offers £20 rewards for French "deserters" recruiting in Minas and for couriers carrying letters to Father La Loutre

Monckton takes Fort Beauséjour and other Chignecto forts in June, and is ordered to drive surrendering Acadians "out of the country"

Map: Fort Beauséjour and Fort Gaspareaux

Minas Acadians want former rights and neutrality, which Nova Scotia Council finds "arrogant" and condemns point by point (Note: "savages" used)

When Deputies refuse oath before consulting their people, Council arrests them and decides "all such Recusants" should be removed

After further refusal by Acadians to take oath, Council decides to consider "what measures should be taken to send them away"

Instructions sent to local commanders list destinations ranging from Boston and Connecticut to Virginia and North Carolina for expelled Acadians

"Very Disagreable to my natural make & Temper" - At Grand-Pré church, John Winslow orders dispossession and expulsion of Acadians

"[Scene] of Sorrow" - Soldiers march many "Praying, Singing & Crying" Acadian men past women and children to transport ships at Grand-Pré

"[Scene] of woe & Distres" - After weeks of delay, first eighty Acadian families are put aboard transports at Grand-Pré

"Putting a Finishing Stroke to the Removal of our Friends the French" - From Halifax, Winslow orders last Minas Acadians expelled

Lawrence considers proposed legislature impracticable and, given "foolish Squabbles" and "impertin't Opinions," dangerously obstructive

John Rous relates attacking French in their Newfoundland "Encroachments" and sending them to Louisbourg and their ships and cargo to Halifax

"Prudence, spirit, and resolution" - William Johnson made baronet for his leadership in September battle near Lake George

While strengthening Oswego defences, William Shirley looks for support from Six Nations, Mississauga, Ojibwe and Odawa

Sachem Canaghquayeson tells William Johnson ("Brother Warraghiyagey") that Oneida have opened their eyes to French threat

Author describes origin stories (hare, carp, bear) and manitous of Odawa (Note: racial stereotypes used)

Strong French military character ("manners") and "enterprizing manners" of Canada do not measure up to politically advanced British soldier

Geographical difference between Great Lakes and Mississippi River lands and Atlantic seaboard lands gives French advantage over British

References

 
55
Canada